India national badminton team represents India in international team badminton and is governed by the Badminton Association of India. The men's team has won the Thomas Cup in 2022. The Indian team competed in the 2011 Sudirman Cup and shared the fifth rank with three other teams, what is up to now the best performance in the Sudirman Cup. It is currently ranked 6th in the World. It has won 25 medals at the Commonwealth Games and 10 medals at the Asian Games along with 10 medals at the BWF World Championships and 3 medals at the Summer Olympics.

Participation in BWF competitions

Thomas Cup

Uber Cup

Sudirman Cup
{| class="wikitable"
|-
! Year !! Result
|-
| 1991 || 19th − Group 5 Promoted
|-
| 1993 || 18th − Group 4 Relegated
|-
| 1995 || 20th − Group 5
|-
| 1997 || 19th − Group 3
|-
| 1999 || 16th − Group 3
|-
| 2001 || 17th − Group 3
|-
| 2003 || 16th − Group 3
|-
| 2005 || 18th − Group 3
|-
| 2007 || 18th − Group 3
|-
| 2009 || 17th − Group 3 Promoted
|-
| 2011 || Quarter-finalist
|-
| 2013 || Group stage − 10th
|-
| 2015 || Group stage − 10th
|-
| 2017 || Quarter-finalist
|-
| 2019 || Group stage − 12th
|-
| 2021 || Group stage − 12th
|-
| 2023 || Qualified
|}

 **Red border color indicates tournament was held on home soil.Participation in Badminton Asia Team Championships

Men's team

Women's team

Mixed team

 **Red border color indicates tournament was held on home soil.''

Participation in the Commonwealth Games

Men's team

Women's team

Mixed team

Participation in the Asian Games

Men's team

Women's team

Participation in the South Asian Games

Current players

Men

Singles
Srikanth Kidambi
 Lakshya Sen
 H.S. Prannoy
 B. Sai Praneeth
 Sameer Verma
 Kiran George
 Mithun Manjunath
 Priyanshu Rajawat
 Sourabh Verma
 Parupalli Kashyap
 Meiraba Luwang Maisnam
 Chirag Sen

Doubles
 Manu Attri
 B. Sumeeth Reddy
 Satwiksairaj Rankireddy
 Chirag Shetty
 Pranav Chopra
 Dhruv Kapila
 Arjun M.R.
 Ishaan Bhatnagar
 Sai Pratheek.K
 Krishna Prasad Garaga
 Vishnuvardhan Goud Panjala

Women

Singles
 Saina Nehwal
 PV Sindhu
 Malvika Bansod
 Aakarshi Kashyap
 Tasnim Mir
 Ashmita Chaliha
 Rituparna Das
 Tanvi Lad
 Unnati Hooda

Doubles
 Ashwini Ponnappa
 N. Sikki Reddy
 Maneesha Kukkapalli
 Poorvisha S Ram
 Gayathri Gopichand
 Treesa Jolly
 Rutaparna Panda
 Tanisha Crasto
 Shikha Gautam
 Ashwini Bhat K.
 Simran Singhi
 Ritika Thaker
 Shruti Mishra

Former notable players

Men
 Prakash Padukone
 Syed Modi
 Pullela Gopichand
 Chetan Anand

Women
 Aparna Popat
 P.V.V. Lakshmi
 Jwala Gutta
 Shruti Kurien

References

External links
Indian Badminton team wins gold
Indian Badminton 
Badminton association of India (official site)

Badminton in India
National badminton teams
badminton